The International Telecommunication Union (ITU) Constitution and Convention of the International Telecommunication Union (short: ITU Constitution and Convention or ITU CS CV) is an international treaty, signed and ratified by almost all countries of the world. The treaty is the founding document of the ITU, a specialized agency of the United Nations. The convention was concluded on 22 December 1992 in Geneva. The ITU Constitution and Convention succeeded and replaced the 1865 International Telegraph Convention.

As of 2016, the ITU Constitution and Convention has 193 state parties, which includes 192 United Nations member states plus the Holy See. States which are eligible to ratify the document but have not are the Cook Islands, Niue, Palau, and the State of Palestine.

The wording of preamble of the ITU Constitution and Convention is as follows:
While fully recognizing the sovereign right of each State to regulate its telecommunication and having regard to the growing importance of telecommunication for the preservation of peace and the economic and social development of all States, the States Parties to this Constitution, as the basic instrument of the International Telecommunication Union, and to the Convention of the International Telecommunication Union (hereinafter referred to as "the Convention") which complements it, with the object of facilitating peaceful relations, international cooperation among peoples and economic and social development by means of efficient telecommunication services, have agreed as follows: [followed by the wording of the Constitution]

In article 4, the Constitution lays down the instruments of the ITU as follows:
the Constitution of the International Telecommunication Union
the Convention of the International Telecommunication Union and
the Administrative Regulations.

The provisions of the Constitution and the Convention are further complemented by those of the Administrative Regulations. This Administrative Regulations comprise the
 ITU International Telecommunication Regulations (ITR), and
 ITU Radio Regulations (RR)
and are binding on all ITU member states as well.

References

Further reading 

Constitution and Convention of the International Telecommunication Union

External links
International Telecommunication Union (ITU)

Constitution and Convention
Treaties concluded in 1992
1865 treaties
United Nations treaties
Telecommunications treaties
1992 in Switzerland
Treaties of the Kingdom of Afghanistan
Treaties of the Principality of Albania
Treaties of Algeria
Treaties of Andorra
Treaties of the People's Republic of Angola
Treaties of Antigua and Barbuda
Treaties of Argentina
Treaties of Armenia
Treaties of Australia
Treaties of the Colony of New South Wales
Treaties of the Colony of Queensland
Treaties of the Colony of Tasmania
Treaties of the Colony of Victoria
Treaties of the Colony of Western Australia
Treaties of the Austrian Empire
Treaties of Azerbaijan
Treaties of the Bahamas
Treaties of Bahrain
Treaties of Bangladesh
Treaties of Barbados
Treaties of the Byelorussian Soviet Socialist Republic
Treaties of Belgium
Treaties of Belize
Treaties of the Republic of Dahomey
Treaties of Bhutan
Treaties of Bolivia
Treaties of Bosnia and Herzegovina
Treaties of Botswana
Treaties of the Empire of Brazil
Treaties of Brunei
Treaties of the Principality of Bulgaria
Treaties of Burkina Faso
Treaties of Burundi
Treaties of Cape Verde
Treaties of the French protectorate of Cambodia
Treaties of Cameroon
Treaties of Canada
Treaties of the Central African Republic
Treaties of Chad
Treaties of Chile
Treaties of the Republic of China (1912–1949)
Treaties of Colombia
Treaties of the Comoros
Treaties of the Republic of the Congo
Treaties of Costa Rica
Treaties of Ivory Coast
Treaties of Croatia
Treaties of Cuba
Treaties of Cyprus
Treaties of the Czech Republic
Treaties of Czechoslovakia
Treaties of North Korea
Treaties of the Republic of the Congo (Léopoldville)
Treaties of Denmark
Treaties of Djibouti
Treaties of Dominica
Treaties of the Dominican Republic
Treaties of Ecuador
Treaties of the Khedivate of Egypt
Treaties of El Salvador
Treaties of Equatorial Guinea
Treaties of Eritrea
Treaties of Estonia
Treaties of the Ethiopian Empire
Treaties of Fiji
Treaties of Finland
Treaties of the Second French Empire
Treaties of Gabon
Treaties of the Gambia
Treaties of Georgia (country)
Treaties of Germany
Treaties of Ghana
Treaties of the Kingdom of Greece
Treaties of Grenada
Treaties of Guatemala
Treaties of Guinea
Treaties of Guinea-Bissau
Treaties of Guyana
Treaties of Haiti
Treaties of the Holy See
Treaties of Honduras
Treaties of the Kingdom of Hungary (1000–1918)
Treaties of Iceland
Treaties of British India
Treaties of Indonesia
Treaties of the Qajar dynasty
Treaties of Mandatory Iraq
Treaties of the Irish Free State
Treaties of Israel
Treaties of the Kingdom of Italy (1861–1946)
Treaties of Jamaica
Treaties of Japan
Treaties of Jordan
Treaties of Kazakhstan
Treaties of Kenya
Treaties of Kiribati
Treaties of South Korea
Treaties extended to the Sheikhdom of Kuwait
Treaties of Kyrgyzstan
Treaties of the Kingdom of Laos
Treaties of Latvia
Treaties extended to the French Mandate for Syria and the Lebanon
Treaties of Liberia
Treaties of the Kingdom of Libya
Treaties of Liechtenstein
Treaties of Lithuania
Treaties of Luxembourg
Treaties of Madagascar
Treaties of Malawi
Treaties of the Federation of Malaya
Treaties of the Maldives
Treaties of Mali
Treaties of Malta
Treaties of the Marshall Islands
Treaties of Mauritania
Treaties of Mauritius
Treaties of Mexico
Treaties of the Federated States of Micronesia
Treaties of Moldova
Treaties of Monaco
Treaties of the Mongolian People's Republic
Treaties of Montenegro
Treaties of Morocco
Treaties of the People's Republic of Mozambique
Treaties extended to British Burma
Treaties of Myanmar
Treaties of Namibia
Treaties of Nauru
Treaties of Nepal
Treaties of Kuwait
Treaties of the Netherlands
Treaties of the Colony of New Zealand
Treaties of Nicaragua
Treaties of Niger
Treaties of Nigeria
Treaties of the United Kingdoms of Sweden and Norway
Treaties of Oman
Treaties of the Dominion of Pakistan
Treaties of Panama
Treaties of Papua New Guinea
Treaties of Paraguay
Treaties of Peru
Treaties of the Insular Government of the Philippine Islands
Treaties of the Second Polish Republic
Treaties of the Kingdom of Portugal
Treaties of Qatar
Treaties of the United Principalities
Treaties of the Russian Empire
Treaties of Rwanda
Treaties of Saint Kitts and Nevis
Treaties of Saint Lucia
Treaties of Saint Vincent and the Grenadines
Treaties of Samoa
Treaties of San Marino
Treaties of São Tomé and Príncipe
Treaties of Saudi Arabia
Treaties of Senegal
Treaties of Serbia and Montenegro
Treaties of Seychelles
Treaties of Sierra Leone
Treaties of Singapore
Treaties of Slovakia
Treaties of Slovenia
Treaties of the Solomon Islands
Treaties of the Somali Republic
Treaties of the Union of South Africa
Treaties of South Sudan
Treaties of the Spanish Empire
Treaties of Sri Lanka
Treaties of the Republic of the Sudan (1956–1969)
Treaties of Suriname
Treaties of Eswatini
Treaties of Switzerland
Treaties of Syria
Treaties of Lebanon
Treaties of Tajikistan
Treaties of Tanganyika
Treaties of Thailand
Treaties of North Macedonia
Treaties of East Timor
Treaties of Togo
Treaties of Tonga
Treaties of Trinidad and Tobago
Treaties of Tunisia
Treaties of the Ottoman Empire
Treaties of Turkmenistan
Treaties of Tuvalu
Treaties of Uganda
Treaties of the Ukrainian Soviet Socialist Republic
Treaties of the United Arab Emirates
Treaties of the United Kingdom (1801–1922)
Treaties of the United States
Treaties of Uruguay
Treaties of Uzbekistan
Treaties of Vanuatu
Treaties of Venezuela
Treaties of the State of Vietnam
Treaties of the Mutawakkilite Kingdom of Yemen
Treaties of Zambia
Treaties of Zimbabwe
Treaties of Yugoslavia
Treaties extended to Aruba
Treaties extended to the Netherlands Antilles
Treaties extended to the Faroe Islands
Treaties extended to Greenland
1865 in the Russian Empire
Treaties establishing intergovernmental organizations